Saltwater Lagoon is a lagoon located on the West Coast of New Zealand's South Island.

It is in the southern Westland District, with Abut Head to the west and the village of Harihari to the east/southeast. The lagoon is located on the coast of the Tasman Sea and has a narrow sea opening at the western end that lets in saltwater. No rivers feed into the lagoon, but the Hinatua River passes very close to the lagoon's eastern shore.

Westland District
Lagoons of New Zealand
Landforms of the West Coast, New Zealand